Bogue Phalia is a stream in the U.S. state of Mississippi. It is a tributary to the Big Sunflower River.

Bogue Phalia is a name derived from the Choctaw language meaning "long creek". A variant spelling is "Bogue Phaliah".

References

Rivers of Mississippi
Rivers of Bolivar County, Mississippi
Rivers of Washington County, Mississippi
Mississippi placenames of Native American origin